Modanville is a scattered community in New South Wales, Australia, situated  north of the city of Lismore. At the 2006 census, it had a population of 515 people.

It contains farmland and areas of rainforest, and is known for dairy and macadamia farming. The closest village, Dunoon, is called the Macadamia Capital of Australia.

Known as a village of Lismore, Modanville is actually a locality, a broad area of land with farmhouses. 

A general store, takeaway food shop and bicycle shop currently serve the community. A primary school, Modanville Public School, is attended by students from the village and surrounding areas.

Modanville is the home of the Richmond Birdwing butterfly.

Notes and references

Towns in New South Wales
Northern Rivers
City of Lismore